Coccidiphila patriciae is a moth in the family Cosmopterigidae. It is found on the Canary Islands.

Adults have been recorded in February.

The larvae feed on the seeds of Ixanthus viscosus.

References

Moths described in 2000
Cosmopteriginae